Maksym Serhiyovych Kucheryavyi (born 9 May 2002) is a Ukrainian professional footballer who plays as a midfielder for Scottish club Falkirk, on loan from St Johnstone.

Club career
Kucheriavyi was born in Kyiv, and played locally for DYuSSh-15 Kyiv.

After playing in a youth tournament in the city, Kucheriavyi was scouted by Scottish club Heart of Midlothian, and travelled 2,500 miles between the countries to train, for a period of two years. After failing to gain a contract with Hearts, he instead signed with St Johnstone on a three-year deal.

At the start of the 2021–22 season, he moved on loan to Brechin City. After a "brilliant spell" with the club, scoring nine goals in 19 appearances, he was recalled by St Johnstone in January 2022. He then moved on loan to Kelty Hearts, and in March 2022 he scored the winning goal which guaranteed Kelty's Scottish League Two title.

He moved on loan to Falkirk in February 2023.

International career
Kucheriavyi has played for the Ukraine under-17 team.

Personal life
Following the 2022 Russian invasion of Ukraine, Kucheriavyi spoke about the impact on his family in the country. He also launched a fundraiser.

Honours
Kelty Hearts
 Scottish League Two: 2021–22

References

External links
 
 

2002 births
Living people
Footballers from Kyiv
Ukrainian footballers
Ukraine youth international footballers
Ukraine under-21 international footballers
Association football midfielders
St Johnstone F.C. players
Brechin City F.C. players
Kelty Hearts F.C. players
Falkirk F.C. players
Scottish Professional Football League players
Ukrainian expatriate footballers
Ukrainian expatriate sportspeople in Scotland
Expatriate footballers in Scotland